Sundeep Jora (born 20 October 2001) is a Nepalese cricketer. He made his international cricket debut on 28 January 2019 against UAE in third ODI match of the series. He is the youngest player to score a T20I fifty.

He made his Twenty20 International (T20I) debut for Nepal against the United Arab Emirates on 31 January 2019. He scored 53 not out to become the youngest male cricketer to score a half-century in a T20I match, at the age of 17 years and 103 days. In April 2019, he was named in Nepal's squad for the Asia qualification tournament for the 2020 Under-19 Cricket World Cup. He also featured  in The 2019–20 Oman Pentangular Series.

In November 2019, he was named in Nepal's squad for the 2019 ACC Emerging Teams Asia Cup in Bangladesh. Later the same month, he was also named in Nepal's squad for the cricket tournament at the 2019 South Asian Games. The Nepal team won the bronze medal, after they beat the Maldives by five wickets in the third-place playoff match.

References

External links
 

2001 births
Living people
Nepalese cricketers
Nepal One Day International cricketers
Nepal Twenty20 International cricketers
People from Kanchanpur District
South Asian Games bronze medalists for Nepal
South Asian Games medalists in cricket